The Union Springs Redbirds were a Minor League Baseball team that represented Union Springs, Alabama in the Alabama–Florida League from 1936 to 1938.

External links
Baseball Reference

Baseball teams established in 1936
Baseball teams disestablished in 1938
Professional baseball teams in Alabama
Defunct Alabama-Florida League teams
1936 establishments in Alabama
1938 disestablishments in Alabama
Defunct baseball teams in Alabama